Pseudosimochromis margaretae is a species of cichlid endemic to Lake Tanganyika where it is only known from the area of Kigoma in Tanzania. It can reach a length of  SL. It can also be found in the aquarium trade.

Etymology
The specific name honours Margaret Mary Smith (1916-1987), who was the first director of the J.L.B. Smith Institute of Ichthyology.

References

Fauna of Tanzania
margaretae
Taxa named by Glen Scott Axelrod
Taxa named by James A. Harrison
Fish described in 1978
Taxonomy articles created by Polbot
Taxobox binomials not recognized by IUCN